Chicas Malas (English: Bad Girls) is the fourth studio album by Spanish recording singer-songwriter Mónica Naranjo. It was released through Sony on 26 October 2001. The album features several notable collaborations, with such worldwide-known influences, the album sales were disappointing.

Background and contract issues
An English-language version of the album entitled, Bad Girls, was released in 2002, "Ain't Better Like This" a song written and produced by Gregg Alexander, is the only song recorded in English, originally she was going to record the song in Spanish for Chicas Malas, and include exclusively the English version on Bad Girls, but due to the explicit lyrics, Mónica decided to record only the English-language version of the song, and include it in both albums. Just after the release of Chicas Malas, Naranjo informed the head of Sony Music Entertainment, Tommy Mottola he was leaving the record label. As a result, all promotions concerning the Chicas Malas and Bad Girls albums were stopped. Mónica has said about the album "It was a project in which Sony more spent nationally. I don't like it, but I did it for ambition and it's an album that I don't even want to hear". The album had four singles released respectively, "Chicas Malas", "Sacrificio", "No Voy a Llorar" and "Ain't Better Like This". A Special Edition of the album was originally planned; however, it never came to fruition.

Track listing

Credits and personnel
Credits adapted from AllMusic.

Mónica Naranjo – Coros, Digital Producer, Realization
Chris Rodriguez – Spanish Guitar
Gina Foster – Coros
Diane Warren – Executive Producer
Juan Gonzalez – Engineer
Paul Meehan – Assistant Producer
Gary Barlow – Programming, Instrumentation
Silvio Pozzoli – Coros
Manuel Machado – Coros, Trumpet
Ian Cooper – Mastering
James Loughrey – Engineer
Mario Lucy – Engineer, Mastering
Tracie Ackerman – Coros
Carlos Martin – Graphic Design, Artwork Direction
David Frazer – Mixing
Juanjo Manez – Estilista
Louis Biancaniello – Programming, Producer, Engineer, Keyboards, Mixing
Tom Bender – Assistant Engineer
David Massey – Artwork Direction
Dennis Rivadeneira – Assistant Engineer
Kris Kello – Programming, Producer
Sam Watters – Producer, Coros, Engineer, Mixing
Jamie Bridges – Assistant

Fausto Demetrio – Assistant Engineer
Annie Roseberry – Artwork Direction
Ramon Gonzalez – Congas
Cristóbal Sansano – Digital Producer, Executive Producer, Mixing
Ben Coombs – Assistant Engineer
Bruno Zuchetti – Programming, Keyboards, Mixing, arranger
Eliot Kennedy – Programming, Instrumentation
Maurizio Tonelli – Engineer
Manny Benito – Adaptation
Emanuela Cortese – Coros
Cesare Chiodo – Bajo
Stefano de Maco – Coros
Sheilah Cuffy – Coros
Giulia Fasolino – Coros, Realization, arranger
Jaume DeLaiguana – Photography
Alfredo Golino – Bateria, Realization, arranger
Dario Caglioni – Digital Editing, engineer
Gregg Alexander – Producer, Vocal Producer
Segundo Mijares – Saxophone
Ali Olmo – Coros
Tim Woodcock – Programming, Instrumentation
Aurora Beltran – Adaptation
Maurizio Fabrizio – Guitar, Orchestra Director

Certifications

Release history

Chicas Malas exclusive item usa 24 February 2002 Trifold limites editions 80 Copies.

References

2001 albums
Mónica Naranjo albums
Sony Music albums
Albums produced by Louis Biancaniello
Albums produced by Sam Watters